Tocumwal Airport  is located  east of Tocumwal, New South Wales, Australia. Both runways have parallel runways labelled for glider operations.

See also
List of airports in New South Wales

References

Airports in New South Wales